This is a list of giants and giantesses from mythology and folklore; it does not include giants from modern fantasy fiction or role-playing games (for those, see list of species in fantasy fiction).

Abrahamic religions & Religions of the ancient Near East

 ʿĀd
 Anakim - Book of Genesis
 The Book of Giants - Manichaeism
 Elioud - Hebrew Bible
 Emite
 Gaf - Mandaeism
 Gibborim
 Goliath - Book of Samuel
 Humbaba - Ancient Mesopotamian religion
 Krun - Mandaeism
 Marid
 Nephilim
 Nimrod - Genesis & Books of Chronicles
 Og - Book of Numbers
 Repha'im
 Saint Christopher - Golden Legend

African folklore
 Matsieng Footprints
 Mbombo

Armenian mythology
 Hayk

Australian folklore

 Crooked Mick
 Thardid Jimbo
 Yowie

Celtic mythology

Brythonic mythology

 Cewri
Brân the Blessed
Ysbaddaden Bencawr
Idris Gawr
 Cormoran
 Cymidei Cymeinfoll
 Gogmagog
 Maelor Gawr
 Welsh giants

Gaelic mythology

 Am Fear Liath Mòr
 Bertram de Shotts
 Fachan
 Fionn mac Cumhaill
 Fomorians
 Balor
 Bres
 Cethlenn
 Elatha
 Ériu
 Ethniu
 Fódla
 Tethra
 Cú Chulainn
 Trow

Chinese folklore

 Fangfeng
 Kuafu
 Pangu
 Yeren

Tibetan mythology
 Yeti

Dutch folklore

 Druon Antigoon
 Ellert and Brammert
 Pier Gerlofs Donia

English folklore

 Ascapart
 Blunderbore
 Buggane
 Colbrand
 Cormoran
 Ettins
 Galehaut
 Goram and Vincent
 Jack the Giant Killer
 Jack and the Beanstalk
 Jack o' Legs
 Jack-in-Irons
 Little John
 Lubber fiend
 Ogre
 Orgoglio
 Penhill Giant
 Thunderdell
 Tom Hickathrift
 William of Lindholme
 Yernagate

Fennoscandian folklore and mythology

Finnic mythologies

 Antero Vipunen
 Kalevi and his sons
 Toell the Great
 Vanapagan

Norse mythology

 Fin
 Gryla
 Jötunn
 Ægir
 Alvaldi
 Angrboða
 Aurboða
 Baugi
 Beli
 Bergelmir
 Bestla
 Billingr
 Bölþorn
 Brimir
 Dúrnir
 Eggþér
 Fárbauti
 Fjölvar
 Gangr
 Geirröd
 Gillingr
 Gjálp and Greip
 Gríðr
 Gunnlöð
 Gyllir
 Gymir
 Harðgreipr
 Helblindi
 Hljod
 Hræsvelgr
 Hraudung
 Hrímgerðr
 Hrímgrímnir
 Hrímnir
 Hroðr
 Hrungnir
 Hrymr
 Hymir
 Hyrrokkin
 Iði
 Ím
 Járnsaxa
 Jörð
 Kári
 Leikn
 Litr
 Logi
 Mögþrasir
 Móðguðr
 Rindr
 Skaði
 Sinmara
 Sökkmímir
 Starkad
 Surtr
 Suttungr
 Þjazi
 Þökk
 Þrívaldi
 Þrúðgelmir
 Þrymr
 Útgarða-Loki
 Vafþrúðnir
 Víðblindi
 Vörnir
 Ymir
 Nine Mothers of Heimdallr
 The Giant Who Had No Heart in His Body
 Þorgerðr Hölgabrúðr and Irpa

Sámi folklore

 Stallo

French folklore

 Ferragut
 Gayant

German folklore

 Bergmönch
 Fasolt
 Haymon
 Jupiter Column
 Rübezahl
 Teutobochus
 Thyrsus

Greek and Roman mythology

 Aloadae
 Antaeus
 Argus Panoptes
 Arimaspi
 Caca
 Cacus
 Cyclopes
 Arges
 Polyphemus
 Damasen
 Gegenees
 Geryon
 Gigantes:
 Alcyoneus
 Almops
 Athos
 Damysus
 Enceladus
 Mimas
 Pallas
 Picolous
 Polybotes
 Porphyrion
 Gration
 Hecatoncheires
 Hyperboreans
 Laestrygonians
 Menoetius
 Orion
 Syrbotae
 Talos
 Titans
 Anytos
 Asteria
 Astraeus
 Atlas
 Coeus
 Crius
 Cronus
 Dione
 Eos
 Epimetheus
 Hyperion
 Iapetus
 Mnemosyne
 Oceanus
 Ophion
 Pallas
 Perses
 Phoebe
 Prometheus
 Pyroeis
 Rhea
 Selene
 Syceus
 Tethys
 Theia
 Themis
 Tityos

Iberian mythology

Basque mythology
 Basajaun
 Jentil
 Mairu
 Olentzero
 Tartalo

Cantabrian mythology
 Ojáncanu

Indian religions

 Mande Barung
 Ten Giant Warriors

Hindu mythology
 Asura
 Daitya
 Hiranyakashipu
 Hiranyaksha
 Mahabali
 Rakshasa
 Kumbhakarna
 Ravana

Jainism
 Nabhi
 Rishabhanatha

Japanese folklore

 Daidarabotchi
 Emperor Chūai
 Emperor Keikō
 Gashadokuro
 Hibagon
 Oni

Malaysian folklore

 Orang Mawas

North American folklore

 Alfred Bulltop Stormalong
 Amala - Pacific Northwest Coast
 Antonine Barada
 Beast of Bray Road
 Bigfoot
 Dzunukwa - Kwakwakaʼwakw mythology
 Febold Feboldson
 Flatwoods monster
 Flying Head - Iroquois mythology
 Fouke Monster
 Gaoh - Iroquois mythology
 Honey Island Swamp monster
 Jenu - Miꞌkmaq
 Johnny Kaw
 Michigan Dogman
 Mogollon Monster
 Momo the Monster
 Quinametzin - Aztec mythology
 Mixtecatl
 Otomitl
 Tenoch
 Ulmecatl
 Xelhua
 Xicalancatl
 Paul Bunyan
 Si-Te-Cah - Northern Paiute people
 Skunk ape
 Tsul 'Kalu - Cherokee spiritual beliefs
 Wechuge - Athabaskan
 Wendigo
 Zipacna - Maya mythology

Oceanian Mythology

Fijian mythology
 Flaming Teeth

Māori mythology
 Maero

Persian mythology

 Div

Philippine mythology

 Bungisngis
 Kapre

Romanian folklore
 Căpcăun
 Uriaș
 Zmeoaică
 Zmeu

Slavic paganism

Bulgarian mythology
 Ispolin

South American mythology and folklore

 Moai
 Patagon

Brazilian mythology
 Mapinguari

Chilean mythology
 Cherufe - Mapuche religion

Other
 A Book of Giants
 Brobdingnag, fictional land of giants from Jonathan Swift's, Gulliver's Travels
 Ent
 Gargantua and Pantagruel
 Hurtaly, fictional giant from François Rabelais' Gargantua and Pantagruel
 The Selfish Giant, a short story by Oscar Wilde
 Nix Nought Nothing
 Veli Jože
 Young Ronald

See also

 Baltic mythology
 Childe of Hale, English giant in Tudor England
 Finnic mythologies
 Giant animal (mythology)
 Giants (esotericism)
 Giant's Causeway
 Jörmungandr, giant serpent in Norse mythology
 Paleo-Balkan mythology
 Processional giant
 Processional giants and dragons in Belgium and France
 Proto-Indo-European mythology
 Typhon, giant serpent in Greek mythology

References

Giants